Kilcher may refer to:

  (born 1963), Swiss professor for Literary criticism and cultural studies at ETH Zürich
 Atz Kilcher (born 1947), a member of the reality TV Kilcher clan
 Jewel Kilcher (born 1974), American singer-songwriter, guitarist, actress, and poet
 Mossy Kilcher, Alaskan singer-songwriter homesteader, member of Alaskan Kilcher clan, mother of Jewel
 Q'orianka Kilcher (born 1990), American actress and singer
 Stefanie Martin-Kilcher (born 1945), Swiss archaeologist
 Werner Kilcher (1927-1995), Swiss equestrian rider
 Yule F. Kilcher (1913-1998), Swiss-born U.S. homesteader in Alaska, founder of the Kilcher clan that became reality TV stars
 Kilcher family, the relatives of Jewel Kilcher featured on Alaska: The Last Frontier reality TV show